Melica radula is a species of grass endemic to China (Lea, Jilin, and Shanxi).

Description
The leaf-sheaths are scabrous, smooth, tubular, and are closed on one end. The main panicle branches are appressed.

They also have fertile spikelets that are hairy and have filiformed and pubescent pedicels. The spikelets have fertile florets that are diminished at the apex while the sterile florets are barren, clumped and orbicular. They are also have acute apexes but are different in the amount of veins and other features; Lower glume is 1–3 veined and is ovate while the upper one is only 3–5 veined and is linear.

Its lemma have scabrous and tuberculate surface with an obtuse apex. Its palea have ciliolated keels and is 2-veined.

References

radula
Grasses of China
Flora of Jilin
Flora of Shanxi